The Slide Brothers are an American band featuring musicians playing lap steel guitar and pedal steel guitar. The band members were all schooled in the Sacred Steel tradition.

They were featured in Conan on TBS and World Cafe on NPR.

Members 
 Calvin Cooke
 Darick Campbell
 Chuck Campbell
 Aubrey Ghent

Discography 
Robert Randolph Presents The Slide Brothers (2013)

References 

American instrumental musical groups